Meghana Deepak Sakore (Bordikar) is an Indian politician and member of the Bharatiya Janata Party.

Political career
Meghna Bordikar is a first term member of the Maharashtra Legislative Assembly from the Jintur assembly constituency in Parbhani where she won against Vijay Manikrao Bhamale of the Nationalist Congress Party by 3717 votes.

Positions held 

 Maharashtra Legislative Assembly from Jintur.
 Terms in office:2019–.

References 

Bharatiya Janata Party politicians from Maharashtra
Maharashtra MLAs 2019–2024
Living people
Marathi politicians
21st-century Indian women politicians
21st-century Indian politicians
1980 births
Women members of the Maharashtra Legislative Assembly